Miroljub "Dugi" Damjanović (born 25 November 1950) is a Serbian retired basketball player.

Career 
Damjanović was a member of Radnički Belgrade teams that won the Yugoslav League in the 1972–73 season and the Yugoslav Cup in 1976. He played in the 1977 FIBA European Cup Winners' Cup final.

Damjanović was a member of the Yugoslavia national junior team that competed at the 1970 FIBA Europe Championship for Juniors. He was a member of the Yugoslavia national team that competed in the men's tournament at the 1972 Summer Olympics.

References

External links
 
 Moj Beograd, Miroljub Dugi Damjanović on YouTube
 Sportski spomenar at RTS

1950 births
Living people
Basketball players at the 1972 Summer Olympics
Competitors at the 1971 Mediterranean Games
BKK Radnički players
Olympic basketball players of Yugoslavia
Mediterranean Games gold medalists for Yugoslavia
Small forwards
Serbian expatriate basketball people in Bosnia and Herzegovina
Serbian expatriate basketball people in Switzerland
Serbian expatriate basketball people in the United Arab Emirates
Serbian men's basketball players
Serbian basketball executives and administrators
Sportspeople from Leskovac
Yugoslav men's basketball players
Mediterranean Games medalists in basketball